Oudlajan is a historic neighborhood in Tehran, Iran. The neighborhood is surrounded by Pamenar Street, Cyrus Street (Mostafa Khomeini), Cheragh Bargh (Amir Kabir) and BozarJomehr Street (15 Khordad). Oudlajan, in addition to Arg, Dolat, Sangelaj, Bazar and Chalmeidan, constituted Old Tehran during the reign of Naser al-Din Shah Qajar (1848-1896). Old Oudlajan consisted of 2619 houses and 1146 shops and was one of the biggest and wealthiest neighborhoods in Tehran.

Etymology 
The name Oudlajan in the historic Tati language means the 'place for dividing the water'. Some believe that Oudlajan means 'Abdullah Jan' (Dear Abdullah) in a Jewish dialect.

Before the spread of the Persian language, most people of Oudlajan spoke the Tati language.

History 

Most of the people living in Oudlajan were Jewish. In addition there were Zoroastrians living in Oudlajan. Many famous Iranian politicians such as Qavam family, Mostofi Family, Nasiroldoleh, Seyyed Hassan Modarres lived in Oudlajan. The houses with many rooms around a yard (with a small pool in the middle) were called Ghamar khanoom houses. 

Oudlajan was the wealthiest neighborhood in the Qajar era and kept its status until the Pahlavi era. However, with the big changes in Iranian society in 1340 AH it gradually lost its status. The biggest obstacle to Oudlajan today is the expansion of the Bazar neighborhood. This trend has changed Oudlajan from a wealthy neighborhood into a storage area for Bazar and many old houses were turned into places for addicts.

In the 1940s-1950s, during the reign of Mohammad Reza Pahlavi, as a result of the neighborhood's decline and the growth of Tehran and its enlargement to the north, the Jewish inhabitants of Oudlajan gradually moved to Tehran's northern parts, in particular Bagh-Saba (East), Hasan Abad (West) and its neighborhoods.

Synagogues 
Tehran's oldest synagogues are located in Oudlajan.

References 

Geography of Tehran